The 1993 Grand Prix Hassan II was an Association of Tennis Professionals men's tennis tournament held in Casablanca, Morocco and was part of the World Series of the 1993 ATP Tour. It was the 9th edition of the tournament and was held from 15 March until 22 March 1993. Third-seeded Guillermo Pérez Roldán won his second consecutive singles title at the event.

Finals

Singles

 Guillermo Pérez Roldán defeated  Younes El Aynaoui 6–4, 6–3
 It was Perez-Roldan's only title of the year and the 9th of his career.

Doubles

 Mike Bauer /  Piet Norval defeated  Ģirts Dzelde /  Goran Prpić 7–5, 7–6
 It was Bauer's 1st title of the year and the 10th of his career. It was Norval's 1st title of the year and the 2nd of his career.

References

External links
 ATP tournament profile

 
Grand Prix Hassan II
Grand Prix Hassan II